Lavia was a cruise ship that caught fire and sank in Hong Kong Harbour in 1989. She was built for Cunard White Star Line in 1947 as the cargo liner Media. In 1961 she was sold to Italy, rebuilt as an ocean liner and renamed Flavia. In 1969, she was refitted as a cruise ship and renamed Flavian. In 1982 she was sold to Panama and renamed Lavia. She was undergoing a refit when the fire occurred. The damage to her was so great that she was scrapped.

History

Media
Media was built by John Brown & Company, Clydebank, West Dunbartonshire. She was yard number 629 and was launched on 12 December 1946, with completion in August 1947.

Media and her sister ship Parthia were the first ships built for Cunard after the conclusion of World War II, and were built for transatlantic service between Liverpool and New York City. Media's maiden voyage began on 20 August 1947 from Liverpool. She received a major refit in 1953, part of which was the introduction of stabilisers; Media was the first ship on the transatlantic route so equipped. She continued on the transatlantic trade through the late 1950s, by which time competition from jet airliners had cut into her passenger trade, and newer, faster cargo ships had done the same to her cargo trade.

Flavia

In July 1961, Media was sold for £740,000 to the Italian Cogedar Line to replace their . She remained in service with Cunard until 30 September. On 12 October she was handed over in Liverpool, arriving at Genoa on 21 October. A nine-month refit by Officine A & R Navi, Genoa transformed her from a passenger-cargo liner to an ocean liner. She could now carry 1,320 tourist class passengers. The ship was renamed Flavia and used for round the world voyages and to transport emigrants to Australia. on 2 October 1962, Flavia departed from Genoa on her maiden voyage for the Cogedar Line. Sailing via the Suez Canal she visited Fremantle, Melbourne and Sydney, arriving on 9 October. Departing  from Sydney on 10 October, she sailed to Bremerhaven, which was to be her base for round the world voyages.

The route that Flavia took on her round the world voyages was Bremerhaven – Rotterdam – Tilbury – Curaçao – Panama Canal – Papeete – Auckland – Sydney –Melbourne – Fremantle – Aden – Suez Canal – Port Said – Cannes – Tilbury – Rotterdam – Bremerhaven. With the closure of the Suez Canal in 1967 as a result of the Six-Day War, Flavia sailed via South Africa on her return to Europe. In 1968, the Cogedar Line was taken over by the Costa Line. She was refitted with her accommodation upgraded and a reduction in berths to 850 passengers transformed her into a cruise ship. She was used for cruises from Miami to the Bahamas until July 1977. She was then used for cruises in South America until April 1978, followed by Mediterranean cruises until September 1978, following which she resumed service on the Miami–Bahamas cruises. By the early 1980s, Flavia was showing her age and was becoming too expensive to operate.

Flavian
She was sold to the Virtue Shipping Company of Hong Kong and renamed Flavian. It was intended to use her as a casino cruise ship but these cruises were unpopular and Flavian spent the majority of the time moored in Hong Kong Harbour.

Lavia

In 1982, the ship was renamed Lavia and a refit was started. On 7 January 1989, a workman's fire got out of control. It spread throughout the ship although all nine crew and 35 workmen on board escaped unharmed. Four fireboats and over 250 firefighters tackled the blaze but Lavia sank owing to the vast amounts of water pumped aboard her in an effort to put out the flames. The ship was refloated and towed to Taiwan, where she arrived on 19 June. She was scrapped by Chi Shun Hia Steel of Kaohsiung.

Description and propulsion

Identification
Media had the United Kingdom Official Number 181093 from 1947–61. In 1961, the ship was allocated the IMO Number 5116139. Flavia also had the Italian Official Number 3260 from 1961–69 and 1069 from 1969–82.

References

External links
 Media on Chris' Cunard Page

Ships built on the River Clyde
1946 ships
Cargo liners
Ships of the Cunard Line
Steamships of the United Kingdom
Passenger ships of the United Kingdom
Cruise ships
Steamships of Italy
Passenger ships of Italy
Steamships of Panama
Passenger ships of Panama
Ship fires
Maritime incidents in 1989